Břasy is a municipality and village in the Rokycany District in the Plzeň Region of the Czech Republic. It has about 2,300 inhabitants.

Administrative parts
Villages of Darová, Kříše, Stupno and Vranovice are administrative parts of Břasy.

Etymology
The name is derived from the folk name for "heather" (in Czech vřes).

Geography
It lies in the Plasy Uplands at largely deforested plateau, which falls sharply towards the valley of Berounka River in the west.

The Berounka forms the western municipal border. The Dírecký Stream is a minor watercourse that flows across the municipality into the Berounka. The slopes along Berounka and both above-mentioned brooks are largely covered with forest, while central part of Břasy is largely forestless, except for scattered woods between the Břasy proper, Vranovice, Kříše and Stupno which replaced the abandoned coal mines and other industrial facilities.

History
The first written mention of Břasy is from 1379 under its previous name Vranov. The village rapidly grew in the 19th century thanks to influx of workers into the coal mines. At the turn of the 20th century Vranov had population of 1,200. The name of Břasy originally applied only to small workers' colony which was annexed by Vranov in 1918. In 1960 five municipalities were united under the municipality of Břasy. In 1982 even Vranov proper was renamed Břasy.

The main impetus to industrial development was coal mining, area of Břasy became one of centres of Radnice coal basin. Local coal deposits were made available thanks to opening of Chrást-Stupno railway in 1863. In 1893 Stupno-Radnice stretch of the railway was added. Local network of railway sidings for coal transport evolved between Vranov and Stupno, from 1908 this siding was electrically powered. In 1953 it was abandoned, while the Chrást-Radnice railway operates until now. Mining activity resulted in population growth. Other industrial companies settled in Břasy too, such as glass plant in Vranov (until 1933, later converted to furniture factory, which closed in 1997), ceramics factory in Vranov, iron-foundry in Vranov, another ceramics factory later converted to chemical factory. In 1933 statue in memory of miners by leftist sculptor Emanuel Famíra was built in Vranov, only to be demolished by German authorities in 1941. In 1945 Břasy was liberated both by American and Soviet armies. Post-WWII development was also facilitated by Czechoslovak army's presence in Břasy (ground radar station, after 1989 abandoned). In 1969 coal mining in Břasy stopped.

Stupno was mentioned for the first time in 1146. The village's name evolved from Stúpa to Stupná, and finally to Stupno. Stupno grew into major village and served as a population centre of the agglomeration for most of the 19th century. In 1900 Stupno had population of 1,283.

Vranovice was mentioned for the first time in 1115. Unlike Stupno and Břasy it did not enter the contiguous built-up agglomeration but it also underwent rapid population growth as a result of industrial development. In 1900 Vranovice had population of 775.

Kříše was mentioned for the first time in 1384. It also remains territorially distinct but the industrial development took place in the village proper and population growth occurred here too. With influx of workers the population reached more than 1,300 at its peak in 1890.

Darová was mentioned for the first time in 1235. The village is the most outlying part of Břasy. Located in the valley of the Berounka it never really lost its rural character despite some coal and iron ore mining. In 1900 the village's population was 145. Hydroelectric plant was built on the Berounka river at the beginning of the 20th century.

Demographics
As to ethnicity Břasy was traditionally a Czech settlement. However, with massive influx of workers a German-speaking community arose here. Combined population of all five villages forming modern time Břasy exceeded 5,000 at the turn of the 20th century and the agglomeration had semi-urban character. However, with depletion of coal mines the population began to fall and Břasy never reached town status.

Transport
The municipality is located on a train line leading from Ejpovice to Radnice. There is a train station which is served by regional trains.

The road II/232 from Rokycany passes through Břasy continuing to the north towards Liblín. The road II/233 that traverses the municipality connects Břasy with Chrást and Plzeň in the southwest and with Radnice to the northeast.

References

External links

Villages in Rokycany District